Toby Barbara Orenstein (née Press; born May 23, 1937) is an American theatrical director, producer, and educator. She has two honorable mentions for the Tony Honors for Excellence in Theatre. Orenstein was inducted into the Maryland Women's Hall of Fame in 2008. Selected by Eleanor Roosevelt for her federal education project in the Harlem, Orenstein taught Dramaturgy to students in a local public school in the late 1950s. In 1972, at the request of pioneering businessman and philanthropist James Rouse, Orenstein founded the non-profit Columbia Center for Theatrical Arts through which, the nationally acclaimed theatre troupe the Young Columbians was created for the United States Bicentennial. Later, Orenstein established the award-winning Toby's Dinner Theatre in 1975. Her commitment to the performing arts is considered legendary.

Alongside her work in theatre, Orenstein is a community and social activist, and is the president of the board of directors for the Columbia Center for Theatrical Arts. She raises funds for scholarships and community programs including over ten years of producing Labor of Love to raise money for the AIDS Alliance of Howard County. Orenstein has also chaired and directed the Howard County Arts Gala for the Arts Council (3 years), participated in the events for the Carson Scholars Fund, and directed and produced plays for United Service Organizations and the United States Armed Forces stationed overseas. In 2014, Orenstein was honored with the Leadership Award for Accessibility by the Howard County Commission on Disabilities.

Early life
Orenstein was born The Bronx, New York City, to Mildred and Sam Press. As a child, Orenstein had an innate proclivity towards drama leading to her first role was as a pilgrim in a kindergarten play. This interest in drama continued through Primary school where she directed shows in school and on the playground with her classmates.

Orenstein successfully auditioned for the selective High School of Performing Arts in New York City. Onlookers of the audition described her delivery of a monologue as coming from "the gut." After the initial excitement of the acceptance, Orenstein eventually developed a dislike of the school's "lacking support system." Orenstein says of her time at the Performing Arts school, “[It was] cut-throat competitive, not at all a nurturing environment.” Subsequently, Orenstein transferred to a local Bronx high school in the middle of her junior year where she won best actress and directed the senior show.

Career
Upon graduation with a B.F.A. in theatre and a minor in education from Columbia University, Orenstein was selected as one of twelve teachers for Eleanor Roosevelt's federal education project in Harlem, New York called the All Day Neighborhood School Project. Having seen her teach at the Burn Brae Dinner Theatre in Burtonsville, Maryland, in 1972 James Rouse asked  Orenstein to move to Columbia, where she became the founder and director of the Columbia Center for Theatrical Arts (CCTA), a non-profit 501(c)(3) organization that is funded, in part, by the National Endowment for the Arts, the Maryland State Arts Council, and the Howard County Arts Council.  In 1975, she created the Young Columbians, a dynamic performance troupe of young people aged 8–21. Its graduates include several Broadway actors and, most notably, former Howard County resident Edward Norton, an acclaimed actor, activist and Academy Award nominee. Other notable alumni of the Young Columbians include Steve Blanchard and Caroline Bowman. Performance venues include the White House, Wolf Trap, Walt Disney World, The John F. Kennedy Center for the Performing Arts, Merriweather Post Pavilion, The Fillmore, Lake Kittamaqundi, The Ellipse, House of the Temple, the Washington D.C. Temple, and others. Since 1979, Orenstein is also the Artistic Director and owner of Toby's Dinner Theatre in Columbia, Maryland.

Personal life 
Orenstein is married to economist Harold (Hal) Orenstein. Together they have two children: a son, Jeffery (born 1961), and a daughter, Mindy (born 1963). They reside in Columbia, Maryland.

Education and awards

Education 
 High School of Performing Arts (first 2.5 years)
 Bronx (area) High School 
 Cortland State Teachers' College (first year)
 B.F.A. in Theatre with a minor in education from Columbia University

Awards 
 1985: Voted Columbian of the Year by Columbia Magazine 
 1990: Howie Award for outstanding contributions to the Arts in Howard County 
 1996: Helen Hayes Award nomination for Outstanding Director of a Musical 
 1996: Business Volunteer of the Year, Howard County 
 1996-99: Voted Best of Baltimore by Baltimore Magazine for Toby's Dinner Theatre 
 1998: Outstanding Women by the Maryland State Department of Education for creativity and enriching the lives of people in Maryland
 1997: AIDS Alliance Community Recognition Award for 10 years of service, support and guidance 
 2001: Featured in the book: Lives in Arts: Sixteen Women Who Changed Theatre in Baltimore 
 2001: Selected Honorary Chair for Howard County Arts Gala 
 2002: Named to Howard County Women's Hall of Fame 
 2003: Helen Hayes Award for Outstanding Direction of a Musical, Jekyll & Hyde; Maryland's Top 100 Women, The Daily Record 
 2004: National Education Association Summer Assessment Grant 
 2005: Outstanding Service to Educational Theatre, Maryland Theatre Association 
 2007: Marylander of Distinction, Maryland Life Magazine 
 2008: Maryland Women's Hall of Fame, Maryland Commission for Women
 2011: Exemplar Award: ACE Hall of Fame, Howard County Chamber of Commerce
 2012: Sue Hess Maryland Arts Advocate of the Year Award, Maryland Citizens for the Arts
 2015: Audrey Robbins Humanitarian Employee of the Year from the Association of Community Services of Howard County
 2015: Sonya Award from the Carson Scholars fund and presented by Ben Carson
 2016: Person of the Year: Readers' Choice Awards, Maryland Theatre Guide
 2016: Helen Production Award nomination with Lawrence B. Munsey for Outstanding Director of a Musical, Ragtime, The Musical. 
 2016: Helen Production Award nomination for Outstanding Ensemble in a Musical, Ragtime, The Musical. 
 2017: Tony Honors for Excellence in Theatre Honorable Mention presented by Carnegie Mellon University

See also 
 Columbia Center for Theatrical Arts
 Toby's Dinner Theatre
 Young Columbians
 Maryland Women's Hall of Fame

Footnotes

References 

Living people
1937 births
20th-century American businesspeople
21st-century American businesspeople
20th-century American women artists
21st-century American women artists
21st-century American actresses
Columbia University School of the Arts alumni
Fiorello H. LaGuardia High School alumni
Businesspeople from Baltimore
Businesspeople from New York City
 Bronx
People from Columbia, Maryland
American women philanthropists
People from Howard County, Maryland
Philanthropists from New York (state)
Jewish American actresses
Jewish American philanthropists
Jewish American artists
Educators from Maryland
American patrons of the arts
Educators from New York City
20th-century American educators
21st-century American educators
20th-century American women educators
21st-century American women educators
21st-century American Jews